This is a list of airlines which have an Air Operator Certificate issued by the Civil Aviation Authority  of Cyprus.

Scheduled airlines

References

See also 
List of airlines
List of defunct airlines of Cyprus
List of defunct airlines of Europe

 
Airlines
Cyprus
Airlines
Cyprus
Cyprus